Uncle Frank may refer to:

 Frank Potenza (1933–2011), playing a security guard and the host's uncle on Jimmy Kimmel Live!
 Uncle Frank, an alternative stage name of Frank Benbini, the drummer and one third of the Fun Lovin' Criminals
 Uncle Frank, Kevin McCallister's uncle from the film Home Alone
 Uncle Frank, a term of endearment often used in reference to the musician Frank Zappa
 Uncle Frank, a 2002 HBO documentary by Trigger Street Productions, directed by Matthew Ginsburg, about his 85-year-old great uncle, Frank Pour, a musician
 Uncle Frank (film), a 2020 film directed by Alan Ball